Karandighi Assembly constituency is an assembly constituency in Uttar Dinajpur district in the Indian state of West Bengal.

Overview
As per orders of the Delimitation Commission, No. 32 Karandighi Assembly constituency covers Dalkhola Municipality and Altapur I, Altapur II, Dalkhola II, Domhana, Karandighi I, Karandighi II, Lahutara I, Lahutara II, SIMA Anandapur, Raniganj, Rasakhowa I and Rasakhowa II  gram panchayats  of Karandighi community development block.

Karandighi Assembly constituency is part of No. 5 Raiganj (Lok Sabha constituency).

Members of Legislative Assembly

Election results

2021
In the 2021 elections, Goutam Paul of Trinamool Congress defeated his nearest rival, Subhas Chandra Sinha of BJP.

2016
In the 2016 elections, Manodeb Singha of Trinamool Congress defeated his nearest rival, Gokul Behari Roy of AIFB.

2011
In the 2011 elections, Gokul Behari Roy of AIFB defeated his nearest rival Subhas Goswami of Congress.

1977–2006
In the 2006 and 2001 state assembly elections, Gokul Roy of Forward Bloc won the Karandighi assembly seat defeating his nearest rival Haji Sajjad Hussain of Congress. Contests in most years were multi cornered but only winners and runners are being mentioned. Suresh Chandra Singha of Forward Bloc defeated Haji Sajjad Hussain of Congress in 1996. Haji Sajjad Hussain of Congress defeated Suresh Chandra Singha of Forward Bloc in 1991. Suresh Chandra Singha of Forward Bloc defeated Haji Sajjad Hussain of Congress in 1987 and 1982. Haji Sajjad Hussain of Congress defeated Amarendra Nath Singha of Janata Party in 1977.

1951–1972
Haji Sajjad Hussain of Congress won in 1972 and 1971. Suresh Chandra Sinha of Forward Bloc won in 1969. H.S.Hussain of PSP won in 1967. Phanis Chandra Sinha of Congress won in 1962 and 1957. In independent India's first election in 1951 the area was part of Bihar and Mohinuddin Mokhtar of Congress won the Karandighi seat.

References

Assembly constituencies of West Bengal
Politics of Uttar Dinajpur district